FC may refer to:

Businesses, organisations, and schools
 Fergusson College, a science and arts college in Pune, India
 Finncomm Airlines (IATA code)
 FranklinCovey company, NYSE stock symbol FC
 Frontier Corps, a paramilitary force in Pakistan

Science and technology

Computing
 fc (Unix), computer program that relists commands
 FC connector, a type of optical-fiber connector
 Flash controller
 Family Computer, Japanese version of the Nintendo Entertainment System game console
 Fibre Channel, a serial computer bus
 Microsoft File Compare program
 fc a casefolding feature in perl

Vehicles
 Fairchild FC, 1920s and 1930s aircraft
 Holden FC, a motor vehicle
 A second generation Mazda RX-7 car
 Fully cellular, a type of container ship

Medicine
A two-in-one vaccine against the flu and common cold.

Other sciences
 Female condom (FC1, FC2), a contraceptive
 Foot-candle (symbol fc or ft-c), a unit of illumination
 Formal charge, a Lewis structure concept in chemistry
 Fragment crystallizable region, a region of an antibody
 Fuel cell,  an electrochemical cell that converts the chemical energy from a fuel into electricity
 Ferrocene (denoted as Fc), an organic compound

Sport
 Fielder's choice, in baseball statistics
 First-class cricket, a match classification
 Football club

Other uses
 FC (band), UK
 Frontier Corps, a paramilitary force of Pakistan
 Facilitated communication, a discredited communication technique in disabled care
 Fact-checking, a process of verifying information
 Financial center, a geographic cluster of major financial services providers
 Fire Controlman, a rank of the U.S. Navy
 Province of Forlì-Cesena, Italy, vehicle registration code
 Forward caste, in Indian society
 Forward curve, the expected price of a commodity as a function of time
 Franking credit, a type of tax credit
 Freedom Club, a pseudonym of the "Unabomber" Ted Kaczynski
 Fucked Company, a defunct web site
Full combo, a term used in rhythm games
 Functional conversation, designed to convey information in order to help achieve an individual or group goal
 Further Confusion, a furry convention held in the Bay Area of California each January

See also
 Flucytosine or 5-FC, an antifungal medication